The 2022 Supercopa do Brasil de Futebol Feminino (officially the Supercopa Feminina Betano 2022 for sponsorship reasons) was the first edition of the Supercopa do Brasil de Futebol Feminino football competition. It was held between 4 and 13 February 2022.

Corinthians defeated Grêmio 1–0 in the final to win their first title.

Qualified teams
The competition was contested by 8 teams. The teams were chosen between the top twelve teams of the 2021 Campeonato Brasileiro de Futebol Feminino Série A1 and the top four teams of the 2021 Campeonato Brasileiro de Futebol Feminino Série A2 choosing only one team for state. If necessary, a state would gain a second berth according to its 2021 Women's State CBF Ranking position. On 6 December 2021, CBF announced the participating teams.

Teams in bold qualified for the competition.

|

Format
The teams played a single-elimination tournament. All stages were played on a single-leg basis, with the highest-ranked-federation team in the 2022 Women's State Ranking hosting the leg. If the teams belonged to the same federation the highest-ranked team in the 2022 Women's Club Ranking would host the leg. If tied, the penalty shoot-out would be used to determine the winners.

Draw
The draw was held on 17 January 2022, 15:30 at CBF headquarters in Rio de Janeiro. The 8 qualified teams were drawn in a single group (2022 Women's Club Ranking shown in parentheses). 

To determine the home teams, the 2022 Women's State Ranking of the participants was:

Bracket

Quarter-finals

|}

Group A

Group B

Group C

Group D

Semi-finals

|}

Group E

Group F

Final

|}

Group G

Top goalscorers

References

2022 in Brazilian football